BBC Reporting Scotland is the BBC's national television news programme for Scotland, broadcast on BBC One Scotland from the headquarters of BBC Scotland at Pacific Quay in Glasgow.

History
Although BBC Television was established in Scotland since February 1952 – and broadcast some opt-out programming – it did not start its daily Scottish television news service until Friday 30 August 1957, initially consisting of a five-minute bulletin at 6.05pm on weekdays and a sports results programme on Saturdays. The BBC was keen to launch the Scottish News Summary ahead of its new commercial rival in the central belt, Scottish Television (STV) and before the launch of similar bulletins elsewhere in the UK. As it turned out, STV began broadcasting the day after the launch of what was the BBC's first opt-out TV news bulletin, with the commercial rival launching its local bulletins the following Monday. Similar five-minute bulletins were introduced to the rest of the UK the following month. Topical magazine programmes were later introduced to supplement the Scottish news bulletins including Six Ten, Scotland at Six, A Quick Look Round, and a weekly regional opt-out programme for the North of Scotland entitled Talk of the North.

Following the arrival of future director-general Alasdair Milne as controller of BBC Scotland, BBC Reporting Scotland was launched on Monday 1 April 1968 with a greater emphasis on hard news coverage. Inspired by the format of NBC's The Huntley-Brinkley Report in the United States, the programme was presented jointly from the BBC's studios in Glasgow, Edinburgh and Aberdeen.

The original team of presenters were former A Quick Look Round presenter Mary Marquis (Glasgow), news agency journalist Gordon Smith (Edinburgh) and ex-Grampian Television announcer Douglas Kynoch (Aberdeen). Kynoch later became the main anchor in Glasgow while future Pebble Mill at One host Donny MacLeod took over as the Aberdeen presenter. In Edinburgh, later presenters included Renton Laidlaw (later a veteran golf commentator) and Kenneth Roy.

In September 1969, BBC Reporting Scotland was integrated into the networked Nationwide strand. As with their counterparts in the other BBC Nations and Regions, BBC Reporting Scotland team often contributed reports to the Nationwide programme. When Nationwide ended in August 1983, BBC Reporting Scotland was briefly replaced by Scotland Sixty Minutes as part of the revamped news programme, Sixty Minutes, but was reinstated in 1984. Since that time, the BBC Reporting Scotland brand has also been used as the on-screen identity for most of BBC Scotland's television news bulletins.

Arguably the most famous of BBC Reporting Scotland'''s ex-presenters was Mary Marquis, who upon her return in September 1975, became its main anchor until her departure in 1988. Regular co-presenters included John Milne - who remained with the BBC for many years - Malcolm Wilson, Viv Lumsden, Alan Douglas and Eddie Mair.

Jackie Bird became the programme's longest serving presenter, anchoring the main 6.30pm edition of Reporting Scotland for nearly thirty years until her sudden departure in April 2019. Long-serving BBC Scotland sports commentator Archie Macpherson also established the programme's weekend sports previews on Friday nights.

In-depth weather forecasts were introduced as part of a major relaunch of the programme in October 1992, initially fronted by Vanessa Collingridge, and later, the popular Heather Reid (aka Heather the Weather) who stayed with Reporting Scotland for fifteen years. The programme also increased its use of live outside broadcasts and satellite links for news reports and interviews.

The viewing figures for the main 6.30pm programme averaged between 500,000 and 600,000 and have occasionally reached a million, including the night after the Lockerbie disaster in December 1988. In March 1996, part of the programme was shown on BBC1 across the UK following the Dunblane massacre. Occasional special editions, marking major news events, have also aired on the BBC News Channel and BBC Parliament.

BBC Scotland moved to BBC Pacific Quay in 2007. Reporting Scotlands first transmission from the new studios was a breakfast bulletin presented by Rob Matheson, transmitted at 6.25am on Monday 20 August 2007. The studio backdrop features the live view from cameras mounted on the roof of BBC Scotland's new headquarters on the southern banks of the Clyde. When it opened, the new building at Pacific Quay was one of the most up-to-date digital broadcasting facilities in the world and featured the BBC's first HD-capable newsroom. Since 4 October 1999, the programme's on-air titles and graphics have reflected the corporate branding of BBC News, including the signature theme tune composed by David Lowe.

During the 1970s and early 1980s, BBC Reporting Scotland used extracts from both commercial chart songs and library music for signature tunes, such as the Donna Summer cover of MacArthur Park, Jeff Wayne's Jubilation (also used by LWT's The Big Match) and Emerson, Lake & Palmer's version of Fanfare for the Common Man.Reporting Scotlands on-air look was most recently updated when a new set was built in Studio C at BBC Scotland's Pacific Quay studios, reflecting the look of the BBC's network news programmes. It was first seen on screen on 27 January 2014. As of February 2019, BBC Reporting Scotland has been supplemented by a sister hour-long programme, The Nine, airing each weeknight on the BBC Scotland channel. While Reporting Scotland continues to cover Scottish news, The Nines brief also includes UK national and international news coverage from a Scottish perspective. The programme has been compared with the frequent calls to replace Reporting Scotland with a 'Scottish Six' version of the BBC News at Six.

Broadcasting

On weekdays, the programme airs ten times a day on BBC One Scotland:
Breakfast bulletins at 0625, 0655, 0725, 0755, 0825 and 0905 during BBC BreakfastA 15-minute lunchtime programme at 1.30pm, after the BBC News at OneThe main 30-minute evening programme at 6.30pm, after the BBC News at SixA late night bulletin at around 10.30pm, after the BBC News at TenThere are three weekend bulletins (one bulletin on a Saturday and two bulletins on a Sunday) 

A mid-afternoon news summary used to be broadcast at around 4pm after the BBC News Summary on BBC Two Scotland from 1986 until 2003, when the bulletins moved to BBC One Scotland, but this was discontinued at the end of 2012.

Starting in December 2007, a short headline update was aired at 8pm during the BBC News Summary, but this was axed along with the national news summary in May 2018.

Along with other BBC Scotland news and current affairs programming, it can be viewed as a live or on-demand (in full or as individual articles) video stream from the online BBC iPlayer.

The programme can also be watched in any part of the UK (and much of Europe) via the BBC UK regional TV on satellite service transmitted from the Astra satellite at 28.2° east:-
on channel 101 using Sky-branded proprietary satellite receivers with a conditional access card associated with an address in Scotland
on channel 951 using a Sky-branded receiver with a card associated with a non-Scottish address or with no viewing card
on 10,803 MHz, 22,000Ksps, Horizontal polarisation, FEC 5/6 using a normal satellite receiver

Notable on-air team

Reporters and correspondents
Rebecca Curran – Aberdeen reporter
John Johnston – Shetland reporter
Iain Macinnes – Highlands and Islands reporter
Jamie McIvor – News reporter
Steven Godden – News reporter
Ben Philip – News reporter
Katie Hunter – News reporter
Catriona Renton – News reporter
Aileen Clarke – News reporter
David Shanks – Part-time news reporter
Séan O'Neil - Part-time news reporter
Phil McDonald - Part-time news reporter
Louise Cowie – Part-time news reporter
Suzanne Allan – Part-time news reporter
Glenn Campbell – Political editor
David Porter – Political correspondent
Andrew Kerr – Political correspondent
Rajdeep Sandhu – Political correspondent
Lynsey Bews – Political correspondent
Phil Sim – Political correspondent
Kirsten Campbell – Political correspondent
Lisa Summers – Health correspondent
Douglas Fraser – Business and economics editor
David Cowan – Home affairs correspondent
Lucy Adams – Social affairs correspondent
Chris Clements – Social affairs correspondent
Kevin Keane – Environment correspondent
Pauline McLean - Arts correspondent
David Henderson – Business and Transport correspondent
Chris McLaughlin – Sports news correspondent

Former presenters and reporters

Abeer MacIntyre (2001–2008)
Alan Douglas (1978–1996)
Alan Mackay (1980s–2007)
Allan Robb (1993–1994)
Alma Cadzow (1980–1988)
Alasdair Fraser (now with STV News)
Alison Walker (2003–2009)
Alistair Smith
Andrew Anderson (1997-2022)
Andrew Kerr (stand-in anchor)
Anne MacKenzie (1995–1997)
Archie Macpherson
Bill Hamilton (1973–1974)
Bill McFarlan (1985–1995)
Brenda Paterson
Brian Taylor - political editor (1985-2020)
Brian Townsend (journalist)|Brian Townsend (1973)
Campbell Barclay (1976-1982)
Cathy MacDonald (1988–1989) (now with BBC ALBA, BBC Radio nan Gàidheal and BBC Radio Scotland)
Catriona Shearer (2004-2021)
Chick Young (now with BBC Radio Scotland)
Craig Anderson
David Currie (now with BBC Sport Scotland)
David Robertson (2000–2008)
Donny MacLeod
Douglas Kynoch (1968–1973)
Dougie Donnelly
Dougie Vipond (now with Landward)
Eddie Mair (1990–1993) (now with LBC)
Eleanor Bradford (health correspondent, 2001–2016)
Eric Crockhart
Fiona Henderson
Forbes McFall
Gerry Davis (1973–1975)
Gordon Hewitt
Gordon Smith
Hamish Neal
Hazel Irvine (now with BBC Sport)
Heather Reid (1994–2009, now working in academia)
Jackie Bird (1989-2019, works elsewhere in BBC)
Jane Franchi (1979 - 2003)
Jane Lewis (now with BBC Sport Scotland)
James Cook (now with The Nine)
John Duncanson
John Milne (1972–2007)
Jonathan Sutherland (now with BBC Sport Scotland)
Kenneth Roy
Kirsten Campbell
Kirsty Wark (1981–1989, now with Newsnight)
Louise Batchelor (1980s - 1989; 1994 - 2008)
Louise Tait
Louise Welsh
Lucy Whyte (now with The Nine)
Malcolm Wilson
Mary Marquis (1968–1988)
Neil Mudie (1977-1997)
Paddy Christie
Penny Macmillan (1998–2007)
Peter MacRae
Renton Laidlaw (1970–1973)
Rhona McLeod (1995–2019)
Rob Maclean (now with BBC Sport Scotland and BT Sport)
Rob Matheson (1998–2011, now with Al Jazeera English)
Sally McNair (1982-2021)
Stav Danaos (weather presenter 2011–2013, now with BBC Weather)
Vanessa Collingridge
Viv Lumsden (1984–1989)

References

External links

 

1968 Scottish television series debuts
1968 establishments in Scotland
1960s Scottish television series
1970s Scottish television series
1980s Scottish television series
1990s Scottish television series
2000s Scottish television series
2010s Scottish television series
2020s Scottish television series
BBC Regional News shows
BBC Scotland television shows
BBC television news shows
Politics of Scotland
Scottish television news shows